The ninth season of the police procedural/legal drama, Law & Order: Special Victims Unit premiered September 25, 2007 and ended May 13, 2008 on NBC. It aired on Tuesday nights at 10pm/9c. Mariska Hargitay, having won a Golden Globe Award in 2005, received her second Golden Globe nomination for her work in the ninth season.

Production
Showrunner/executive producer Neal Baer was more hands-on in the ninth season of SVU writing episodes "Alternate" and "Authority". The last episode crediting Baer as the primary writer was the seventh season episode "Storm". Multiple episodes of the ninth season dealt openly with the abortion debate. A 2008 article for Newsday that criticized American media for avoiding any mention of abortion called Law & Order: SVU the "one exception... willing to take such risks." This season of SVU also coincided with the 2007 Writers Guild of America strike for which Neal Baer served on the negotiating committee. With all of the writing staff participating in the strike, episodes stopped airing for nearly three whole months after the January 22, 2008 episode "Inconceivable".

With Geoffrey Erb having left during the previous season, George Pattison became the show's director of photography. When discussing the visuals in Season 9, Neal Baer said "Last year, we were too dark; we want better lighting."

Cast changes and returning characters
The first episode "Alternate" reveals that Richard Belzer's character, Detective John Munch, passed the sergeant's exam. As a result, other characters begin to refer to him as Sergeant John Munch. Season 9 dramatically reduced the amount of screen time given to Richard Belzer and the following seasons of SVU continued to do the same. When commenting on the reduction in his workload, Belzer said he was "a bit mystified" and that "It's like yanking the tonsils out of the gift horse if I complain too much."

Towards the end of the season, it was announced that Diane Neal (ADA Casey Novak) was departing the cast and days later it was said that she was fired from the series. Asked if she was blindsided by the news, Neal responded "I don't know if blindsided is the right word.... I've lasted longer by several years than almost any other ADA [in the Law & Order universe]. So every year I've been like, 'Is this going to be the one when I leave?' Dick Wolf is known for replacing his cast regularly. And the truth is, I'm really looking forward to the future."

Adam Beach fully joined the cast as Detective Chester Lake, who had already appeared twice on the show. A plan announced by Neal Baer in February 2007 was to portray the detective as a special victim himself. This was fulfilled in the episode "Fight", which reveals that Lake was a foster child. However, days after Diane Neal's departure was announced, Adam Beach announced that he was departing the cast as well. "I very much enjoyed my year on Law & Order: SVU," Beach said. "Now I'm looking forward to new adventures."

Cast

Main cast
 Christopher Meloni as Senior Detective Elliot Stabler
 Mariska Hargitay as Junior Detective Olivia Benson
 Richard Belzer as Senior Detective Sergeant John Munch
 Diane Neal as Assistant District Attorney Casey Novak
 Ice-T as Junior Detective Odafin "Fin" Tutuola
 Adam Beach as Junior Detective Chester Lake
 BD Wong as FBI Special Agent Dr. George Huang
 Tamara Tunie as Medical Examiner Dr. Melinda Warner
 Dann Florek as Captain Donald "Don" Cragen

Crossover stars
 Sam Waterston as District Attorney Jack McCoy (Crossing over with Law & Order)

Recurring cast

 Mike Doyle as Crime Scene Unit Forensics Technician Ryan O'Halloran
 Joanna Merlin as Judge Lena Petrovsky
 Joel de la Fuente as Technical Assistance Response Unit Technician Ruben Morales
 Caren Browning as Crime Scene Unit Captain Judith Siper
 Peter McRobbie as Judge Walter Bradley
 Austin Lysy as Defense Attorney Russell Hunter
 Isabel Gillies as Kathy Stabler
 Beverly D'Angelo as Defense Attorney Rebecca Balthus

 Steven Weber as Defense Attorney Matthew Braden
 David Lipman as Judge Arthur Cohen
 Anne James as Dr. Jane Larom
 Julia White as Dr. Anne Morella
 John Schuck as Chief of Detectives Muldrew
 Deep Katdare as Dr. Parnell
 Audrie J. Neenan as Judge Lois Preston
 Patricia Kalember as Judge Karen Taten

Guest stars

Cynthia Nixon guest starred in the season premiere "Alternate" as Janis Donovan, a woman with multiple personalities. Nixon described it by saying "I read all about multiple personalities — it was such a juicy part!" This role won her a Primetime Emmy Award for Outstanding Guest Actress in a Drama Series. Nixon had previously appeared in the second ever episode of Law & Order, in 1991.  Bronson Pinchot starred as her psychiatrist. He talked about working with Meloni and Hargitay and described them as "the most welcoming stars of any show I've ever guested on." For the show's 200th episode "Authority", Robin Williams guest starred as an engineer who tries to teach the public a lesson using extreme methods. Williams was nominated for a Primetime Emmy Award for Outstanding Guest Actor in a Drama Series. In an interview about casting, Neal Baer stated that the most famous guest stars used by the show play roles that were written with them in mind. He mentioned Cynthia Nixon and Robin Williams as examples and said that the details of their stories were only written after it was known that they would be available.

Kevin Tighe guest starred as a kidnapper and rapist in the episode "Avatar" which was well received by gamers. The detectives make use of a virtual world similar to Second Life to hunt down his character. In the same episode, reporter David Keeps, who is a friend of Mariska Hargitay, briefly appeared as an unnamed detective. Keeps wrote that he only went to the SVU set for a visit until Hargitay arranged to have him written into the scene at the last minute. The third episode "Impulsive" guest starred Melissa Joan Hart as a teacher and Kyle Gallner as her student in a "he said, she said" rape case. The episode began filming in April 2007 making it the first episode of the ninth season produced.

In "Savant", a child played by Paulina Gerzon becomes the key to solving a case when the SVU learns about her extremely sensitive hearing. Children's author Robert Black praised SVU'''s ability to find good child actors and said that Gerzon "was fantastic as a girl with Williams Syndrome, even having to deliver her lines through a set of oversized false teeth." This episode also showed Vincent Spano reprising his role as FBI Agent Dean Porter. In "Harm", Elizabeth McGovern played Dr. Faith Sutton, a doctor who feels it is her duty to help the war on terror by teaching torture techniques. When talking about this issue, Neal Baer explained "I don't think they should, but I think it's more interesting if we hear Elizabeth McGovern's perspective and say 'I have a son and how are we going to stop this?' and we have a complicated, interesting, deep discussion through our characters. The same interview brought up a line spoken by Elliot Stabler in "Harm" that was critical of invasive interrogations. Baer said that Christopher Meloni requested this line to help keep his character three-dimensional. The episode "Blinded" commented on the Kennedy v. Louisiana debate about punishing child rape with the death penalty. Sam Waterston made an appearance as his Law & Order character, DA Jack McCoy. Since the eighteenth season of Law & Order had yet to air at this point, this was the first time that Jack McCoy appeared as the DA rather than an EADA.

The episode "Fight" featured guest appearances by UFC fighters Forrest Griffin and Renzo Gracie. Nicole "Coco" Austin also appeared and had a scene with her husband Ice-T. This marked their first acting appearance together even though Coco had appeared on SVU once before. Mark Valley guest starred in the following episode "Paternity" as a father who is shocked to learn that his child is not related to him. Bruce Fretts of TV Guide said he "got more dramatic meat to chew in an hour than he's had in three years on Boston Legal." This episode additionally deals with the birth of Elliot Stabler's fifth child and was submitted as an Emmy bid episode for Christopher Meloni. Olivia Benson finds herself in a situation in which she must help to deliver the baby and Elliot Stabler hugs her as a way of saying thank you. This was not in the script but Meloni insisted on it while the scene was filmed saying "Guys, I have to hug her."

Shareeka Epps made her first television appearance in the dark episode "Undercover" starring as a terrified rape victim who is assaulted by a prison guard. The episode was filmed in a real prison. In "Closet", Bill Pullman starred as Kurt Moss, a reporter in a short-lived relationship with Olivia Benson. As a way of complimenting Pullman, Neal Baer joked that "Benson finally has a boyfriend, and he was well worth the wait." The second last episode "Trade" starred Stephen Collins and Matthew Davis as Pearson Bartlett Sr and Jr, a pair of coffee magnates who come under suspicion in a woman's murder. When asked if he enjoyed being on SVU'', Collins tweeted "yes, but the role was difficult." This was followed by the fast-paced season finale "Cold".

Episodes

References

Bibliography

External links
 Law & Order: Special Victims Unit Season 9 at TVGuide.com
 Law & Order: Special Victims Unit Season 9 - TV IV
 Season 9 episodes at IMDb.com

09
2007 American television seasons
2008 American television seasons